No Way to Treat a Lady  is a 1968 American psychological thriller film with elements of black comedy, directed by Jack Smight, and starring Rod Steiger, Lee Remick, George Segal, and Eileen Heckart. Adapted by John Gay from William Goldman's 1964 novel of the same name, it follows a serial killer in New York City who impersonates various characters in order to gain the trust of women before murdering them.

Released in the spring of 1968, the film earned $3.1 million domestically, and received largely favorable reviews from critics, with praise for Steiger's performance and the film's blending of horror and dark humor. Segal was nominated for a BAFTA Award for Best Actor in a Supporting Role for his portrayal as Detective Moe Brummel.

A musical comedy adaptation by Douglas J. Cohen was produced in 1987, and revived Off-Broadway in 1996.

Plot
Christopher Gill is a serial killer fixated on his late mother, a noted stage actress. Gill preys on older women. A Broadway theatre owner and director, he adopts various disguises in order to put his victims at ease and avoid identification, impersonating characters such as an Irish priest, a policeman, plumber, a flamboyant gay hairdresser, and a transvestite. Once gaining his victims' trust, Gill strangles them to death before painting a pair of lips on their foreheads with garish red lipstick.

Detective Morris Brummell is investigating the murders. Brummel is quoted in the newspaper that the latest murder was well-planned and well-executed. This appeals to Gill's ego, so he starts telephoning Brummel to chat about the murders and the state of the investigation. Brummel is able to elicit a few scraps of information about Gill, but for the most part Gill succeeds in taunting him without giving away his identity.

Away from work, Brummel's own overbearing mother wants her son to be more like his doctor brother and settle down. She is scornful of his career choice. Brummell's new love interest is Kate Palmer, who glimpsed Gill minutes before he committed the first murder, though not well enough to identify him in a way that would aid the investigation. Palmer manages to win over Brummell's mother by claiming she is planning to become Jewish, and by pretending to dominate her son.

In what turns out to be their last phone conversation, Brummel turns the tables on Gill and insults him. Gill subsequently targets Palmer. This is obviously for reasons other than his mother fixation, as Palmer does not fit the profile of his previous victims. He may be jealous of Palmer, or perhaps wants revenge on Brummell for the insults.

Gill attacks Palmer in her apartment, but is forced to flee before he can do her serious harm. During the police manhunt that follows, Gill is seen entering his theatre via a side door. Investigating the sighting, Brummell chats amiably with Gill (the detective at that point cannot be sure the man before him is Palmer's attacker). When he sees in the theatre lobby a painting of an actress with her lips highlighted in deep red lipstick, which Gill volunteers is a portrait of his mother, he knows he has his man.

Brummel confronts Gill with his suspicions, but Gill remains cool. Brummel goes to check out the costume room, and on his way back, as he is passing the theatre stage, Gill attacks him with the backstage rigging. Brummel is staggered, but is able to fatally shoot Gill before he attacks again. In his death swoon Gill revisits the murders he committed, as his deranged mind has recast them.

Cast

Production

Screenplay

Goldman wrote the original novel while experiencing writer's block, when writing Boys and Girls Together (published in 1964). He was inspired by an article about the Boston Strangler which suggested there might be two stranglers operating, and Goldman wondered what would happen if that were the case and they got jealous of each other.

Development
In October 1966 it was announced that Sol C. Siegel had signed a three-picture deal with Paramount Pictures, of which the first was to be an adaptation of No Way to Treat a Lady. In December Siegel hired John Gay to adapt the novel into a screenplay. (Jack Smight later said Goldman refused to do the screen adaptation claiming that a novelist should never adapt his or her work for the screen.)

In March 1967, Jack Smight signed to direct. By May, Rod Steiger was playing the lead and George Segal joined the cast in June.

Paramount was helmed by Robert Evans at the time, but Smight said he received more assistance from his executive Peter Bart. "He was enormously helpful to me under some very trying circumstances," said Smight.

Tony Curtis was Evans' choice to play the detective, but Smight insisted that the role go to George Segal.

Filming
Filming started in June and mostly took place in Brooklyn Heights, New York. The original plan was to shoot three weeks in New York and do all interiors at Paramount's studio but in the end Smight and Siegel decided to shoot the entire film in New York.

"It's Steiger's film," said Segal. "He runs around doing all sorts of different roles and I just stop by and watch him... It's a big, comfortable Hollywood production and I have banker's hours."

Eileen Heckart filmed her scenes during the day while appearing at night in You Know I Can't Hear You When the Water's Running.

Filming was completed by September.

Sol Siegel was reportedly unhappy with the ending, but was overruled by the director and star.

The novel was re-issued under Goldman's name in 1968 to coincide with the release of the film. The New York Times called it "dazzling".

Smight was entitled to 15% of the net profits. He says he never received any, but blames this on studio accounting.

Release

Box office
No Way to Treat a Lady premiered on March 20, 1968, and grossed $3.1 million at the U.S. box office.

Critical response
Wanda Hale of the New York Daily News praised the film for Steiger's "tour-de-force performance" and its blending of humor and the macabre. The People critic Ernest Betts likened the film to the works of Alfred Hitchcock, praising Steiger's performance and summarizing: "The film has a macabre humor which just takes the edge off the horror and is sometimes hilarious."

Vincent Canby of The New York Times wrote of the film: "Beneath all the outrageous make-up, hairpieces, disguises and belly laughs in No Way to Treat a Lady, there is a curious and ironic comment about the land of stifling mother love... There is nothing wrong with this sort of sheer sensation for its own sake as long as the gags and Steiger's masquerades maintain their bold effrontery. When they don't, however, as happens with increasing frequency toward the end, the mind begins to wander."

Actor George Segal was nominated for a BAFTA Award for Best Actor in a Supporting Role for his portrayal of Detective Moe Brummel.

Home media
Paramount Home Entertainment released the film on DVD on September 3, 2002. Under license from Paramount, Scream Factory released the film on Blu-ray for the first time on December 21, 2021.

Related works
In 1987, Douglas J. Cohen adapted the film into a musical comedy, which was revived Off-Broadway by the York Theatre Company in 1996. That production was nominated for an Outer Critics Circle Award for Best Musical Revival.

See also
List of American films of 1968

References

Sources

External links
 
 
 
 

1968 films
1960s black comedy films
1960s comedy thriller films
1960s serial killer films
1960s mystery films
American black comedy films
American comedy thriller films
American mystery films
American police detective films
American serial killer films
American films about revenge
Cross-dressing in film
Films based on American novels
Films based on works by William Goldman
Films directed by Jack Smight
Films produced by Sol C. Siegel
Films scored by Stanley Myers
Films set in New York City
Films shot in New York City
Films with screenplays by John Gay (screenwriter)
Paramount Pictures films
1968 comedy films
1968 drama films
1960s English-language films
1960s American films